Grigorovo is an village in Novgorodsky District of Novgorod Oblast, Russia, located on the right bank of the Veryazha River, west of and immediately adjacent to Veliky Novgorod. Municipally, it is incorporated as Ermolinskoye Rural Settlement in Novgorodsky Municipal District, one of the eight rural settlements in the district. Population:

History

 
Before Grigorovo received its current name, the village was called Yakovleva (Yakovlevo). The village of Yakovleva was first mentioned in 17th century.  The village name is inextricably linked to the estate of the landowner Grigorova, the construction of which took place here in 1841. And since then the village has been named Grigorovo. In 1884, Grigorovo was mentioned as a part of Nikolskaya Volost of Novgorodsky Uyezd of Novgorod Governorate.

On August, 1941, during World War II, the village was occupied by the German Army. In Grigorovo was located the headquarters of the Blue Division. The Red Army liberated the village on January 19, 1944.

On July 5, 1944, Novgorodsky District was transferred to newly established Novgorod Oblast. On January 17, 2005, Grigorovo became the administrative center of newly established Grigorovskaya Rural Settlement in Novgorodsky District of Novgorod Oblast. On April 1, 2014 the settlement was abolished.

Economy

Industry
On the territory of village there are no industrial enterprises.

Transportation
Novgorod-Lugsky Station is located 1 km from Grigorovo, from where trains depart to Luga.

References

Notes

External links

Novgorodsky District
Novgorodsky Uyezd